Staraya Ladoga, known as Ladoga until 1704, is a rural locality (a selo) in Volkhovsky District of Leningrad Oblast, Russia, located on the Volkhov River near Lake Ladoga,  north of the town of Volkhov, the administrative center of the district.

It used to be a prosperous trading outpost in the 8th and 9th centuries. It was dominated by Varangians who became known as the Rus'. For that reason, it is sometimes called the first capital of Russia.

History

Origin

Dendrochronology suggests that Ladoga was founded in 753. Until 950, it was one of the most important trading ports of Eastern Europe. Merchant vessels sailed from the Baltic Sea through Ladoga to Novgorod and then to Constantinople or the Caspian Sea. This route is known as the trade route from the Varangians to the Greeks. An alternative way led down the Volga River along the Volga trade route to the Khazar capital of Atil, and then to the southern shores of the Caspian Sea, all the way to Baghdad. Tellingly, the oldest Arabian Middle Age coin in Europe was unearthed in Ladoga.

Ladoga under Rurik and the Rurikids

According to the Hypatian Codex that was created at the end of the 13th century, the legendary Varangian leader Rurik arrived at Ladoga in 862 and made it his capital. Rurik later moved to Novgorod and subsequently his successors moved from there to Kiev where foundations for the powerful state of Kievan Rus' were laid. There are several huge tumulus, or royal funerary barrows, at the outskirts of Ladoga. One of them is said to be Rurik's grave, and another one—that of his successor Oleg. The Heimskringla and other Norse sources mention that in the late 990s Eric Haakonsson of Norway raided the coast and set the town ablaze. Ladoga was the most important trading center in Eastern Europe from about 800 to 900 CE, and it is estimated that between 90% to 95% of all Arab dirhams found in Sweden passed through Ladoga.

Ladoga's next mention in chronicles is dated 1019, when Ingigerd of Sweden married Yaroslav of Novgorod. Under the terms of their marriage settlement, Yaroslav ceded Ladoga to his wife, who appointed her father's cousin, the Swedish earl Ragnvald Ulfsson, to rule the town. This information is confirmed by sagas and archaeological evidence, which suggests that Ladoga gradually evolved into a primarily Varangian settlement. At least two Swedish kings spent their youths in Ladoga, Stenkil and Inge I, and possibly also King Anund Gårdske.

In the 12th and 13th centuries, Ladoga functioned as a trade outpost of the powerful Novgorod Republic. Later its trade significance declined and most of the population engaged in fishing in the 15th century. After new fortresses such as Oreshek and Korela were constructed in the 14th century further to the west of Ladoga, the town's military significance also decreased. Ladoga belonged to Vodskaya Pyatina of the Republic and contained eighty-four homesteads in the 15th century; most of the land belonged to the church. The Novgorodians built there a citadel with five towers and several churches.

Later history
After the town of Novaya Ladoga (New Ladoga) was founded in 1704 by Peter the Great, Ladoga became known as Staraya Ladoga and its importance decreased.

Sights and landmarks
The heart of Staraya Ladoga is an old fortress where the Ladozhka flows into the Volkhov. In earlier times, it was a strategic site because it was the only possible harbor for sea-vessels that could not navigate through the Volkhov River. The fortress was rebuilt at the turn of the 15th and 16th centuries. 
In 1703, Peter the Great founded the town of Novaya Ladoga (New Ladoga) closer to the bank of Lake Ladoga. The ancient fortress thenceforth declined and came to be known as Staraya Ladoga (Old Ladoga), in order to distinguish it from the new town.  The reconstruction of one of the towers of Staraya Ladoga's fortress was scheduled to be completed in 2010.

The mid-12th-century churches of St. George and of Mary's Assumption stand in all their original glory. Inside St. George's, some magnificent 12th-century frescoes are still visible. In addition, there is a mid-12th-century church of St. Climent, which stands in ruins.

There is also the Assumption Nunnery/Monastery, and a monastery, dedicated to St. Nicholas which was constructed mainly in the 17th century.

Culture and art
Staraya Ladoga's barrows, architectural monuments, and romantic views of the Volkhov River have always been drawing attention of Russian painters. There were the artists Ivan Aivazovsky, Orest Kiprensky, Aleksander Orłowski, Ivan Ivanov, Alexey Venetsianov and many others in the 19th century. A future member of the Imperial Academy of Arts and the Peredvizhniki group Vassily Maximov was born and laid to rest there. He portrayed scenes from an everyday life of peasants.

Nicholas Roerich painted his studies there during the summer of 1899. He named this landscape the best of the Russian one. Valentin Serov, Konstantin Korovin, Boris Kustodiev also worked there. Alexander Samokhvalov was in Staraya Ladoga many times in 1924-1926. He took part in the restoration of the St. George's Church. That experience gave a great deal to the artist, he wrote. It helped him to understand the effect of joining a monumental painting with the architectural forms. In result of this dwelling in that place painter made his "Staraya Ladoga" (1924) and "Family of Fisherman"(1926, Russian Museum)

In February 1945 the ex-estate of the prince Shakhovskoy was given to Leningrad artists as a base zone for rest and creative work. The restoring works continued 15 years from 1946. But Leningrad artists began to arrive to Staraya Ladoga from 1940s. It became a source of inspiration for Sergei Osipov, Gleb Savinov, Nikolai Timkov, Arseny Semionov and many others for many years.

The House of Creativity «Staraya Ladoga began to operate permanently in the beginning of the 1960s after the finish of the restoration. It was an important center of the art life of Russia for 30 years. Such artists as Evsey Moiseenko, Alexander Samokhvalov, Vecheslav Zagonek, Dmitry Belyaev, Vladimir Ovchinnikov, Boris Ugarov, Boris Shamanov, Vsevolod Bazhenov, Piotr Buchkin, Zlata Bizova, Taisia Afonina, Marina Kozlovskaya, Dmitry Maevsky, Alexander Semionov, Arseny Semionov, Irina Dobrekova, Vladimir Sakson, Gleb Savinov, Elena Zhukova, Sergei Zakharov, Ivan Varichev, Veniamin Borisov, Valery Vatenin, Ivan Godlevsky, Vladimir Krantz, Lazar Yazgur, Irina Dobrekova, Piotr Fomin and many other Leningrad and other regions painters and graphic artists worked there.
 
In 1970-1980 as the House of Creativity was widening,  new buildings were built. They used it a whole-year. A dwelling there for 1–2 months was without any payment for the artists. All commitments on housing, food and travel were taken on by the Art Foundation of the Russian Soviet Federative Socialist Republic. The paintings created there were exposed in first-rate art exhibitions. It completed the collections of the main museums of Soviet Union and numerous private collections of Russia and abroad. Also it became a base of an extensive collection of painting, graphics and sculpture of the museum “Staraya Ladoga”.

Financing of the House of Creativity stopped at the beginning of the 1990s on the breakup of the USSR and after the liquidation of the Art Foundation. It stopped welcoming artists and was closed.

References

Notes

Sources

А.Н. Самохвалов. Ладога, и не только Ладога // А. Н. Самохвалов. Мой творческий путь. — Л: Художник РСФСР, 1977.
А.Н. Самохвалов. В поисках монументальной выразительности // А. Н. Самохвалов. В годы беспокойного солнца. — СПб: Всемирное слово, 1996.
Д.П. Бучкин. О доме творчества «Старая Ладога» // Д. П. Бучкин. Гравюры и рассказы. — СПб, Бибилиотека «Невского альманаха», 2004.
Н. В. Мурашова, Л. П. Мыслина. Дворянские усадьбы Санкт-Петербургской губернии. Южное Приладожье. Кировский и Волховский районы. — СПб, Алаборг, 2009.
Л. С. Конова. Санкт-Петербургский Союз художников. Краткая хроника 1932-2009 // Петербургские искусствоведческие тетради. Выпуск 20. — СПб, 2012.

External links

History of Old Ladoga
Detailed info on the fortress
House of Creativity Staraya Ladoga in Art Gallery "Blue Living" Artist's Union of Saint Petersburg (VIDEO)
The Fund of Painting, Grafics, and Sculptures of reserve-museum Staraya Ladoga
 Old Ladoga Museum

 
Rural localities in Leningrad Oblast
753 establishments
Novgorod Republic
Trading posts of the Hanseatic League
Archaeological sites in Russia
Defunct towns in Russia
Varangians
Populated places established in the 8th century
8th-century establishments in Russia
8th-century establishments in Europe